Rage for Order is the second studio album by the American progressive metal band Queensrÿche, released on June 27, 1986. The album was re-released on May 6, 2003 with four bonus tracks.

Overview
Rage for Order was more progressive than the band's previous releases, with a layered and complex musical structure that employs a two-guitar approach, but also brought keyboards forward in the mix. Lyrically, the album explored social/personal, political and technological themes, among others highlighting the dangers of artificial intelligence and government intrusion. The concept of robotics was emphasized through the use of staccato rhythms and vocal effects such as a reverse echo.

The band's management insisted on Queensrÿche taking an image associated more with glam rock, glam metal or gothic metal. As a result, the promo photos and album artwork depicted the band members wearing trench coats, heavy make-up and perms.

The cover of the Dalbello song "Gonna Get Close to You" was chosen as the album's first single.

The tour supporting Rage for Order spanned approximately seven months and included being the opening act for Ratt, AC/DC, Bon Jovi and Ozzy Osbourne, although their music was not quite compatible.

Some tracks recorded during the sessions for Rage for Order were not used on the album. "Prophecy" was released as the B-side of "Gonna Get Close to You" and later included on the 1989 re-issue of the Queensrÿche EP. Other songs such as "From the Darkside" and "The Dream" remained demos. The band had also written "Rage for Order" as a title track. Although it was not included on the album, the main riff from this song was worked into an instrumental piece played during some shows on the tour in support of this album, and eventually morphed into the track "Anarchy—X" on the Operation: Mindcrime album, released in 1988.

Rage for Order was the first album cover of Queensrÿche to prominently feature the band's Tri-Ryche logo, as nearly all later album covers would, each time with subtle changes made to the logo. Although not credited, the front cover was designed by the late English-born metal and rock journalist Garry Sharpe-Young, who later also founded MusicMight. It had originally been proposed for a 12" picture disc, which never materialized, but was used by EMI-America without permission for the album cover. A few thousand initial copies bear a bluish-silver banner that was later changed to black, in order to make the artist and title easier to read. The original cassette edition also had all the gold accents on the cover changed to white. CDs bearing the blue ring cover are even more rare. Only a few hundred copies were printed before the ring was switched to black.

Despite the band's emphasis on keyboards and digital technology tricks such as the "reverse echo", Rage for Order was recorded and mixed in analog. On a short television documentary which aired in 1986, Scott Rockenfield stated that the drums were recorded in a stone warehouse using Le Mobile recording studios. Michael Wilton said that to get a guitar sound that they were happy with they "used two old Marshall's that were on the verge of exploding" by using a Variac causing the transformers to work harder.

Music
Musically, Rage for Order has been described as a progressive metal and glam metal album.

Critical reception

In a retrospective review, Robert Taylor of AllMusic had a mixed reaction to Rage for Order. Taylor stated that the band had "lost their edge a bit on this release" and compared the album's sound to the glam metal movement of the time. The review praised Geoff Tate's vocals, but called the lyrics "heavy-handed" and stated that they had not aged well.

In 2005, Rage for Order was ranked number 343 in Rock Hard magazine's book The 500 Greatest Rock & Metal Albums of All Time.

Track listing

Personnel 
Queensrÿche
 Geoff Tate – lead vocals, keyboards
 Chris DeGarmo – guitars, backing vocals
 Michael Wilton – guitars, backing vocals
 Eddie Jackson – bass, backing vocals
 Scott Rockenfield – drums, percussion

Additional musicians
 Neil Kernon – keyboards
 Bradley Doyle - emulator programming

Production
 Neil Kernon - production, engineering, mixing
 Dave Ogilvie - engineering
 Rob Porter - engineering
 Keith Cohen - engineering
 Howie Weinberg - mastering
 Queensrÿche – album concept
 Moshe Brakha – album photography
 Henry Marquez – art direction
 Glenn Parsons – design

Charts

Certifications

Accolades
Rage for Order was ranked No. 88 on Kerrang! magazine's "100 Greatest Heavy Metal Albums Of All Time" in January 1989.

See also
List of glam metal albums and songs

References

1986 albums
Albums produced by Neil Kernon
EMI America Records albums
Queensrÿche albums